Uđi slobodno... is the fifteenth studio album by pop-folk singer Lepa Brena. It was released 28 June 2008 through the record label Grand Production, after an eight-year hiatus. Marina Tucaković is the sole lyricist of five songs on the album, while the lyrics of the remaining five songs were co-written with Ljiljana Jorgovanović. The sole composer and arranger (with the exception of the song "Dva asa") is Aleksandar Milić Mili.

Release 
Brena first announced on 28 April 2008 that her fifteenth album would be titled Uđi slobodno... and released on 28 June 2008. The album's lead single, "Pazi kome zavidiš", was released on 19 July 2008, alongside a music video directed by Visual Infinity Production.

Background 
After an multiyear hiatus, in 2007 Lepa Brena agreed to collaborate with Aleksandar Milić - Mili and Marina Tucaković. The album appeared in stores in late June 2008. To mark the album's release, a documentary was broadcast on RTV Pink, with a record rating.

In parallel with promotional activities, Brena recorded the video for the song "Pazi kome zavidiš" in "Visual Infinity" production. For this recording they used the most modern HD cameras ever used in this region as well as advanced film lighting. The scene was filmed in the National Theater in Sombor and Novi Sad. Actors in the video included Aleksandar Jović, Staša Terzić, and Aleksandar Raonić. Brena's black-and-white dress was bought in London, and resembled the dress worn by Marilyn Monroe in the movie Bus Stop

In the Slovenian and Croatian markets, the album was released by Dallas Records.

The first printing was released in 250,000 CDs and 20,000 audio tapes, while the next printing was on 30,000 CDs.

Promotion 

On April 28, 2008 Brena announced a major returnee tour in the former Yugoslavia.

Track listing

Personnel
Srđan Stojanović: Accordion 
Nenad Bojković Neša: Acoustic and electric guitars 
Ivan Milosavljević Milke: Acoustic and electric guitars, keyboard and drum programming
Keyboards: Filip Miletić
Bass: Mirko Kesić
Bouzouki: Petar Trumpetaš
Flute, Fife: Miroljub Jimmy Todorović
Kaval: Spasoje Tufegdžić Spale
Ivan Ilić Ilke: Trombone
Đorđe Bilkić: Solo Violin
Percussion – Zoran Čaušević Kiki
Backing Vocals – Aleksandar Milić Mili, Ivana Selakov

Production
Produced by Aleksandar Milić Mili
Recorded, mixed and edited by Ivan Milosavljevic Milke
Post-production engineering by Boban Milunović
Photography By – Edvard Nalbantjan, Miloš Nadaždin, Nebojša Babić

Music videos
Pazi kome zavidiš (video released February 2009)
Uđi Slobodno (video filmed 25 December 2011; released 20 February 2012)

Notes

Recorded, programmed and mixed at Miligram Studios 2007/2008. 
Postproduced at studio "Fabrika 13", Ljubljana.

References

Lepa Brena albums
2008 albums
Grand Production albums